Prairie School is a late 19th- and early 20th-century architectural style, most common in the Midwestern United States. The style is usually marked by horizontal lines, flat or hipped roofs with broad overhanging eaves, windows grouped in horizontal bands, integration with the landscape, solid construction, craftsmanship, and discipline in the use of ornament. Horizontal lines were thought to evoke and relate to the wide, flat, treeless expanses of America's native prairie landscape.

The Prairie School was an attempt at developing an indigenous North American style of architecture in sympathy with the ideals and design aesthetics of the Arts and Crafts Movement, with which it shared an embrace of handcrafting and craftsman guilds as an antidote to the dehumanizing effects of mass production.

History

The Prairie School developed in sympathy with the ideals and design aesthetics of the Arts and Crafts Movement begun in the late 19th century in England by John Ruskin, William Morris, and others. Along with the kindred American Craftsman movement it shared an embrace of handcrafting and craftsman guilds as a reaction against the new assembly line mass production manufacturing techniques, which was felt to create inferior products and dehumanize workers.

The Prairie School was also an attempt at developing an indigenous North American style of architecture that did not share design elements and aesthetic vocabulary with earlier styles of European classical architecture. Many talented and ambitious young architects had been attracted by building opportunities stemming from the Great Chicago Fire of 1871. The World's Columbian Exposition (Chicago World's Fair) of 1893 was supposed to be a heralding of the city of Chicago's rebirth. But many of the young Midwestern architects of what would become the Prairie School were offended by the Greek and Roman classicism of nearly every building erected for the fair. In reaction, they sought to create new work in and around Chicago that would display a uniquely modern and authentically American style, which came to be called Prairie.

The designation Prairie is due to the dominant horizontality of the majority of Prairie style buildings, which echoes the wide, flat, treeless expanses of the mid-Western United States. The most famous proponent of the style, Frank Lloyd Wright, promoted an idea of "organic architecture" (p. 53), the primary tenet of which was that a structure should look as if it naturally grew from the site. In the words of Wright, buildings that appeared as if they were "married to the ground." (p. 53) Wright also felt that a horizontal orientation was a distinctly American design motif, in that the younger country had much more open, undeveloped land than found in most older and highly urbanized European nations.

Prairie School architects

The Prairie School is mostly associated with a generation of architects employed or influenced by Frank Lloyd Wright or Louis Sullivan, though usually not including Sullivan himself.  While the style originated in Chicago, some Prairie School architects spread its influence well beyond the Midwest. A partial list of Prairie School architects includes:

 John S. Van Bergen
 Lawrence Buck
 Ransom Buffalow
 Barry Byrne
 Alfred Caldwell
 William Drummond
 George Grant Elmslie
 Marion Mahony Griffin
 Walter Burley Griffin	
 Henry John Klutho	
 George Washington Maher
 Mason Maury
 John Randal McDonald
 George Mann Niedecken (Interior)
 Dwight Heald Perkins
 William Gray Purcell
 Isabel Roberts
 Francis Conroy Sullivan
 Claude and Starck
 William LaBarthe Steele
 Trost & Trost
 Andrew Willatzen
 Taylor Woolley
 Frank Lloyd Wright

Prairie School influence
Prairie School houses are characterized by open floor plans, horizontal lines, and indigenous materials.  These were related to the American Arts and Crafts movement and its emphasis on hand craftsmanship, simplicity, and function. Both were alternatives to the then-dominant Classical Revival Style of Greek forms with occasional Roman influences. Some firms, such as Purcell & Elmslie, which accepted the honest presence of machine worked surfaces, consciously rejected the term "Arts and Crafts" for their work. The Prairie School was also heavily influenced by the Idealistic Romantics who believed better homes would create better people, and the Transcendentalist philosophy of Ralph Waldo Emerson. In turn, Prairie School architects influenced subsequent architectural idioms, particularly the less is more ethos of Minimalists and form following function in Bauhaus, itself a mixture of De Stijl grid-based design and Constructist emphasis on the structure itself and its building materials.

Architectural historians have debated the reasons why the Prairie School went out of favor by the mid-1920s.  In her autobiography, Prairie School architect Marion Mahony suggests:

The enthusiastic and able young men as proved in their later work were doubtless as influential in the office later as were these early ones but Wright's early concentration on publicity and his claims that everybody was his disciple had a deadening influence on the Chicago group and only after a quarter of a century do we find creative architecture conspicuously evident in the United States.

Prairie School buildings

An example of Prairie School architecture is the aptly named "The Prairie School", a private day school in Racine, Wisconsin, designed by Taliesin Associates (an architectural firm originated by Wright), and located almost adjacent to Wright's Wingspread Conference Center. Mahony's and Griffin's work in Australia and India, notably the collection of homes at Castlecrag, New South Wales, are fine examples of how the Prairie School spread far from its Chicago roots. Isabel Roberts' Veterans' Memorial Library in St. Cloud, Florida, is another. The House at 8 Berkley Drive at Lockport, New York was listed on the National Register of Historic Places in 2009.

The Oak Circle Historic District is a historic district in Wilmette, Illinois, United States. It primarily consists of fifteen single-family homes representative of the Prairie School and Craftsman styles of architecture constructed between 1917 and 1929. The Oak Circle Historic District was added to the National Register of Historic Places on June 21, 2001; it was the first historic district to be designated in Wilmette.

The Rock Crest–Rock Glen Historic District is a nationally recognized historic district located in Mason City, Iowa. It was listed on the National Register of Historic Places in 1979. All of the buildings are houses designed in the Prairie School style, and are a part of a planned development. Mason City is also home to The Historic Park Inn Hotel and City National Bank—two adjacent commercial buildings designed in the Prairie School style. Completed in 1910, the Historic Park Inn Hotel is the last remaining Frank Lloyd Wright-designed hotel in the world, of the six for which he was the architect of record. The Dr. G.C. Stockman House is another example of Frank Lloyd Wright's Prairie School style found in Mason City, Iowa. Built in 1908, the Stockman House was the first Wright-designed Prairie School-style house in Iowa. Today, the house functions as a museum welcoming visitors and architectural enthusiasts from all around the world.

Modern interest

Interest in the ideas and designs of the Prairie School artists and architects has grown since the late 1980s, thanks in large part to celebrity collecting habits and high-profile auction results on many of the decorative designs from buildings of the era. In addition to numerous books, magazine articles, videos and merchandise promoting the movement, a number of original Prairie School building sites have become public museums, open for tours and special interactive events. Several not-for-profit organizations and on-line communities have been formed to educate people about the Prairie School movement and help preserve the designs associated with it. Some of these organizations and sites are listed in the External links section below.

Gallery

See also
 Hartington City Hall and Auditorium
 The Menninger Clinic, Houston, Texas
 Oak Park, Illinois
 St. John's African Methodist Episcopal Church
 The Villa District, Chicago

Citations

General and cited references 
 Brooks, H. Allen, Frank Lloyd Wright and the Prairie School, Braziller (in association with the Cooper-Hewitt Museum), New York 1984; 
 Brooks, H. Allen, The Prairie School, W. W. Norton, New York 2006;  
 Brooks, H. Allen (editor), Prairie School Architecture: Studies from "The Western Architect", University of Toronto Press, Toronto, Buffalo 1975;  
 Brooks, H. Allen, The Prairie School: Frank Lloyd Wright and his Midwest Contemporaries, University of Toronto Press, Toronto 1972;  
 Brooks, H. Allen (editor), Writings on Wright: Selected Comment on Frank Lloyd Wright, MIT Press, Cambridge MA and London 1981;  
 Visser, Kristin, Frank Lloyd Wright & the Prairie School in Wisconsin: An Architectural Touring Guide, Trails Media Group; 2nd Rev edition (June, 1998).  .

External links

 Unity Temple Restoration Foundation
 Minneapolis Institute of Arts "Unified Vision – the Architecture and Design of the Prairie School" 
 Pleasant Home Foundation for George W. Maher's Farson House
 This Historic Midwestern Masterpiece Got the Renovation It Deserved
 Frank Lloyd Wright's Historic Park Inn Hotel
 Frank Lloyd Wright's Stockman House

 
American architectural styles
House styles